Magic Reservoir is a reservoir on the Big Wood River on the border of Blaine and Camas counties, Idaho. However, most of the reservoir is located in Blaine County. The reservoir and surrounding Bureau of Land Management land offers opportunities for boating, fishing, camping, and hunting, among other activities. The reservoir is impounded by Magic Dam, which was built in 1910.

References

Lakes of Blaine County, Idaho
Lakes of Camas County, Idaho
Reservoirs in Idaho
Articles containing video clips